Difaâ Hassani El Jadidi is a Moroccan football club based in El Jadida. They are currently playing in the Botola.

Home stadium
DHJ play their home games at the Stade El Abdi.

Crest

Kit

Honours
Moroccan Championship: 0
Runners-up: 1975–76, 2008–09, 2016–17

Coupe du Trône: 1
Winners (1): 2013
Runners-up: 1977, 1985, 1986, 2017

Performance in CAF competitions
CAF Champions League: 1 appearance
2010 – First Round
2018 – Group stage

CAF Confederation Cup: 1 appearance
2011 – Second Round of 16
2014 – Second Round of 16

CAF Cup Winners' Cup: 1 appearance
1986 – Quarter-finals

Current squad

Managers

 Jules Accorsi (1989–91), (1995–96)
 Jean-Christian Lang (2006–08)
 François Bracci (2008)
 Denis Lavagne (July 1, 2008 – June 30, 2009)
 Jaouad Milani (March 12, 2011 – Jan 2, 2013)
 Hassan Moumen (Jan 4, 2013 – April 28, 2013)
 Abdelhak Benchikha (July 8, 2013 – May 29, 2014)
 Hassan Shehata (June 4, 2014–14)
 Tarek Mostafa (2014–15)
 Abderrahim Taleb (2016–)

External links

Official website

 
Football clubs in Morocco
Association football clubs established in 1956
1956 establishments in Morocco
Sports clubs in Morocco